Alexander MacQueen (born 12 January 1993) is an English former first-class cricketer.

MacQueen was born at Chertsey. He was educated at Gordon's School in Woking, from there he attended the University of Leeds. While studying at Leeds, MacQueen played first-class cricket for Leeds/Bradford MCCU, debuting against Yorkshire at Headingley. He played first-class cricket for Leeds/Bradford MCCU until 2014, making five appearances. He scored 166 runs in these matches, with a high score of 69 which came on debut against Yorkshire. With his right-arm off break bowling, he took 5 wickets at a bowling average of 56.80, with best figures of 4 for 116. He played minor counties cricket for Northumberland in 2016, making two appearances in the Minor Counties Championship.

References

External links

1993 births
Living people
Sportspeople from Chertsey
Alumni of the University of Leeds
English cricketers
Leeds/Bradford MCCU cricketers
Northumberland cricketers